The Roman Catholic Diocese of Natchez was the predecessor of the Roman Catholic Diocese of Jackson.  It served all of Mississippi until the state was split into two dioceses, Jackson and Biloxi.  The cathedral in Natchez, Mississippi is now a minor basilica and has retained much of its historical architectural splendor. The Diocese was under the patronage of Our Lady of Sorrows.

History

Spanish rule began in the area of Natchez in 1779 and in 1788, a Spanish wood-frame church dedicated to the Holy Savior (San Salvador) was built in the center of the city. San Salvador burned down in 1832.

The Roman Catholic diocese of Natchez, (in Latin Natchesium), was founded on July 28, 1837, and originally covered the entire state of Mississippi. Rev. Thomas Heyden of the Diocese of Pittsburgh was appointed the first bishop of the diocese in 1837, but he respectfully declined. Bishop Antoine Blanc of New Orleans served as administrator. The first bishop of the diocese, John Mary Chanche, S.S. (1795–1852), president of St. Mary's College in Baltimore, was appointed three years later, in 1840. He was consecrated bishop on 14 March, 1841. Chanche sailed to New Orleans and traveled by steamboat to Natchez, where he arrived near midnight on May 18, 1841. On his arrival, he met the only priest in the new diocese, Father Brogard, who was there only temporarily. In the role of a missionary, Bishop Chanche began to contact the Catholics and organize the new diocese. Three of his nieces opened the first Catholic school in Mississippi.

The Cathedral of the Sorrowful Heart of Mary was designed by Baltimore architect Robert Cary Long Jr., an alumnus of St. Mary's. Two years earlier, Long had designed for Chanche a steeple for the college's chapel. The cornerstone was laid in 1842. Chanche died in 1852, presumably of cholera, in Frederick, Maryland, while returning from the First Plenary Council of Baltimore. The diocese had by that time, 11 priests, 11 churches erected, and 13 attendant missions.

Over the years, as the population balance within the state shifted, it became obvious that the operations of the diocese should be moved to Jackson, the state capital. On December 18, 1956, the diocese was renamed the Diocese of Natchez-Jackson and many operations of the diocese moved to Jackson. On March 1, 1977, the Mississippi diocese was split into two dioceses: the Diocese of Jackson and the Diocese of Biloxi. After this, the Diocese of Natchez became a titular see.

Diocesan bishops 
Prior to the erection of the Diocese of Natchez, Louis William Valentine DuBourg served as the Vicar Apostolic of Mississippi from 1825 to 1826.
John J. Chanche, S.S. 1840 – 1852
 James Oliver Van de Velde, July 29, 1853 – November 13, 1855
 William Henry Elder, May 3, 1857 – January 30, 1880
 Francis Janssens, May 1, 1881 – August 7, 1888
 Thomas Heslin, 1889 – 1901
 Thomas Heslin, 1889–1911
 John Edward Gunn, S.M., 1911–1924
 Richard Oliver Gerow, 1924–1967 (in 1956 the Diocese of Natchez was renamed the Diocese of Natchez-Jackson)

Titular bishops
 Daniel Kucera, O.S.B. June 6, 1977 – March 5, 1980
 William H. Bullock June 3, 1980 – February 10, 1987
 John Nolan December 12, 1987 – November 19, 1997 (his death)
 Timothy Dolan June 19, 2001 – June 25, 2002
 Salvatore J. Cordileone July 5, 2002 – March 23, 2009
 Eduardo Nevares May 11, 2010 – present

See also
Roman Catholic Diocese of Jackson

References

External links
'Natchesium':Catholic Hierarchy website
'St. Mary Basilica Archives' website

Roman Catholic Ecclesiastical Province of Mobile
Natchez
Catholic Church in Mississippi
1837 establishments in Mississippi